János Martinek (born 23 May 1965) is a Hungarian modern pentathlete and Olympic champion.

Olympics
Martinek participated on the Hungarian team which won the gold medal at the 1988 Summer Olympics in Seoul, and where he also won an individual gold medal. He won a bronze medal at the 1996 Summer Olympics in Atlanta.

References

External links
 

1965 births
Living people
Hungarian male modern pentathletes
Olympic modern pentathletes of Hungary
Modern pentathletes at the 1988 Summer Olympics
Modern pentathletes at the 1996 Summer Olympics
Olympic gold medalists for Hungary
Olympic bronze medalists for Hungary
Olympic medalists in modern pentathlon
World Modern Pentathlon Championships medalists
Medalists at the 1996 Summer Olympics
Medalists at the 1988 Summer Olympics
Sportspeople from Budapest
20th-century Hungarian people
21st-century Hungarian people